Milleria rehfousi is a moth in the family Zygaenidae that is found in China.

References

Moths described in 1910
Chalcosiinae